Child sexual abuse in the United Kingdom has been reported in the country throughout its history. In about 90% of cases the abuser is a person known to the child. However, cases during the second half of the twentieth century, involving religious institutions, schools, popular entertainers, politicians, military personnel, and other officials, have been revealed and widely publicised since the beginning of the twenty-first century. Child sexual abuse rings in numerous towns and cities across the UK have also drawn considerable attention.

In 2012, celebrity Jimmy Savile was posthumously identified as having been a predatory child sexual abuser for the previous six decades. Subsequent investigations, including those of Operation Yewtree, led to the conviction of several prominent "household names" in the media, allegations against prominent politicians, and calls for a public inquiry to establish what had been known by those responsible for the institutions where abuse had taken place. An Independent Inquiry into Child Sexual Abuse was announced by the British Home Secretary, Theresa May, in July 2014, to examine how the country's institutions have handled their duty of care to protect children from sexual abuse.

Categories of child sexual abuse

The Child Exploitation and Online Protection Command identify four broad categories of child sexual abuse in the United Kingdom, which they describe as the four "key threats" to children.

The proliferation of indecent images of children – particularly the production of still, moving and live-streaming of child abuse images.  Live streaming of abuse of third world children for consumption by UK paedophiles is increasing.  Perpetrators are being increasingly found and brought to justice.  Tracking down and safeguarding third world child victims is more difficult.  There are calls for better funding for the National Crime Agency so these crimes can more easily be prevented.

Online child sexual exploitation – with a focus on the systematic sexual exploitation of multiple child victims on the internet.

Transnational child sexual abuse – including both transient and resident UK nationals and British citizens committing sexual offences abroad.

Contact child sexual abuse – particularly the threat posed by organised crime-associated child sexual exploitation and the risks around missing children. Within this category there are a number of recognised types.

Firstly, contact child sexual abuse by lone offenders.

Secondly, contact child sexual abuse by group offenders and offending associated with street gangs, of which there are two types.

Type 1: Group offending targeting victim vulnerability. This includes street grooming gangs.
Type 2: Group offending as a result of a specific sexual interest in children. This group have a long-standing sexual interest in children with some having a synergy with what has been described as a paedophile "ring".

Statistics
The true number of offences remains doubtful, generally assumed to be larger, due to expected unreported cases of child abuse. Some 90% of the sexually abused children were abused by people who they knew, and about one out of every three abused children did not tell anyone else about it. The vast majority of child sex offenders in England and Wales are male, with men representing 98% of all defendants in 2015/16, and white, with whites representing 85% of convicted child sex offenders and 86% of the general population in 2011. Asians represent 8% of the general population of England and Wales as of 2011. A 2011 analysis by the Child Exploitation and Online Protection Command of 940 possible offenders reported for "street grooming and child sexual exploitation" found that 38% were white, 36% were Asian, while 32% were of an unknown ethnicity. A 2020 report on child sexual exploitation published by the Home Office warns of a “potential for bias and inaccuracies in the way that ethnicity data is collected” with the possibility of “greater attention being paid to certain types of offenders.”

England: In 2016–17 there were 43,522 recorded sexual offences against children under 16 years old, and a further 11,324 offences against young people aged over 16 and under 18. Police recorded 6,009 rapes of children aged under 13 years, and 6,299 rapes of children under 16 years.
Wales: In 2016–17 there were 2,845 recorded sexual offences against children under 16 years old. Police recorded 446 rapes of children aged under 13 years, and 340 rapes of children under 16 years.
Scotland: In 2016-17 there were 4,097 recorded sexual offences against children under 16 years old. Police recorded 196 rapes and attempted rapes of children aged 13–15 years, and 161 rapes and attempted rapes of children under 13 years.
Northern Ireland: In 2016–17 there were 1,875 recorded sexual offences against children and young people under 18 years old. Police recorded 360 rapes and attempted rapes of children and young people aged under 18 years.

Notable incidents
Eliza Armstrong case - a late 19th-century child sexual abuse scandal that led to the passing of the Criminal Law Amendment Act 1885, which raised the age of consent from 13 to 16.
United Kingdom football sexual abuse scandal - started in November 2016 when former professional footballers waived their rights to anonymity and talked publicly about abuse by former football coaches in the 1970s, 1980s and 1990s. The initial allegations centred on Crewe Alexandra and Manchester City.
North Wales child abuse scandal - Scandal leading to a three-year, £13 million investigation into the physical and sexual abuse of children in care homes in the counties of Clwyd and Gwynedd, in North Wales, including the Bryn Estyn children's home at Wrexham, between 1974 and 1990.
Jimmy Savile sexual abuse scandal.  See also Operation Yewtree, the police investigation into abuse by Savile and others.
Kincora Boys' Home - the scandal first came to public attention on 24 January 1980 after a news report in the Irish Independent titled it as "Sex Racket at Children's Home".
Plymouth child abuse case - paedophile ring involving at least five adults from different parts of England.
Rotherham child sexual exploitation scandal - widespread child exploitation in Rotherham, South Yorkshire, England, between 1997 and 2013, estimated to have involved at least 1400 children who were subjected to 'appalling' sexual exploitation by gangs of men, many of Pakistani heritage.
 Rochdale sex trafficking gang.  See also Operation Doublet, an ongoing investigation by Greater Manchester Police.
 Nottingham Care Homes
 Manchester Children's Homes
 Islington Children's Homes
 Telford child sexual exploitation scandal 
 Oxford child sex abuse ring
 Banbury child sex abuse ring
 Derby child sex abuse ring
 Bristol child sex abuse ring
 Newcastle child sex abuse ring
 Halifax child sex abuse ring
 Peterborough sex abuse case
 Berkhamsted paedophile network – A gang led from Berkhamsted in Hertfordshire that was stopped in 2016.
 Norwich sexual abuse ring
 Operation Voicer – A successful police investigation into sexual abuse of babies and infants across England.
 Kidwelly sex cult
 Kesgrave Hall School
 Medomsley Detention Centre – A youth prison in the 1960s, 1970s, and 1980 where over 1,800 former inmates were subjected to serious sexual and physical abuse by prison guards.
Westminster paedophile dossier - A dossier on paedophiles allegedly associated with the British government
Manchester child sex abuse ring
Murder of Alesha MacPhail
2019 South Wales paternal sex abuse case
North West Hebephile Hunters forms
Beechwood children's home – A care home where 136 former residents reported being sexually abused, which police believe is "the small tip of a very large iceberg".
Amberdale children's home
Birmingham bathing cult

Notable offenders

This is an incomplete list of notable British personalities who have been convicted of child sexual abuse.  It does not include notable people, such as Jimmy Savile and Cyril Smith, who were publicly accused of abuse after their deaths, but never prosecuted.
Russell Bishop (1966–2022) - Convicted child molester, murderer and abductor. Arrested and convicted in 1990 and convicted again in 2018. Serving two life sentences. 
Ronald Castree (1953–) - Sexually assaulted, kidnapped, stabbed to death an 11-year-old girl. Castree was jailed for life with a minimum term of 30 years.
Max Clifford (1943–2017) - Leading publicist, found guilty in April 2014 of eight indecent assaults on four girls and women aged 14 to 19, and sentenced to eight years in prison.
Sidney Cooke (1927–) - Dubbed by The Guardian as "Britain's most notorious paedophile".
Chris Denning (1941–) - British disc jockey. He has been jailed several times, for indecency in 1974 at the Old Bailey, 18 months in 1985, three years in 1988, three months in 1996, four years in a Czech prison in 1998 and five years in 2008. Denning regarded them to be "unfair".
Matthew Falder (1989–) - Falder was labelled as one of the most prolific and depraved offenders that the National Crime Agency (NCA) had ever encountered. Falder blackmailed and coerced his victims online into depraving and degrading themselves and then using the images to heighten his profile on paedophile sites on the dark web. Falder was convicted in February 2018 and ordered to serve 32 years in prison.
Gary Glitter (1944–) - Regarded by some to be the father of glam rock, Glitter is also one of the British entertainment industry's most infamous serial sex offenders. His career ended in November 1999 when he was jailed for four months after admitting to a collection of 4,000 hardcore photographs of children being abused. In March 2006, he was jailed again, this time in Vietnam, for sexually abusing two girls. He served almost three years in jail. In October 2012, he was the first person to be arrested under Operation Yewtree - the investigation launched in the wake of the Jimmy Savile scandal. This led to his conviction and jailing again in the UK for a total of 16 years for sexually abusing three young girls between 1975 and 1980.
Rolf Harris (1930–) - British based Australian entertainer. In 2013, Harris was arrested as part of Operation Yewtree and charged with 12 counts of indecent assault and 4 counts of making indecent images of a child. On 30 June 2014, Harris was found guilty on all 12 counts of indecent assault and on 4 July 2014 was sentenced to 5 years and 9 months in prison for a minimum of 2 years and 10 months.
Stuart Hall (1929— ) - Radio and television presenter in North West England and nationally, who presented It's a Knockout and Jeux Sans Frontières and later reported football matches on BBC radio.  He pleaded guilty in April 2013 to having indecently assaulted 13 girls, aged between 9 and 17 years old, between 1967 and 1986, and was sentenced to 30 months imprisonment. In May 2014 he was found guilty on two further charges and was sentenced to an additional 30 months in prison.
Antoni Imiela (1954–2018) - Since March 2012, he had been serving 12 years in prison.
Jonathan King (1944–) - English singer-songwriter, businessman. He was convicted and jailed in 2001 for sexual abuse against boys in the 1980s. King was subsequently denied appeal twice on both conviction and sentence, was released on parole in 2005, and continues to maintain that he was wrongly convicted.
Chris Langham (1949-) - English writer, actor and comedian. On 2 August 2007, Langham was found guilty of 15 charges of downloading and possessing level 5 child sexual abuse images and videos. Langham was jailed for 10 months, reduced to 6 months on appeal. He was made to sign the sex offenders' register and was banned from working with children for 10 years.
William Mayne (1928–2010) - Author of more than 130 books. In 2004 he was imprisoned for two and a half years.
Gene Morrison (1958— ) - In September 2009, convicted of 13 child sexual offenses, he was jailed for 5 years.
Graham Ovenden (1943–) - Known artist. In April 2013, found guilty of child sexual abuse, jailed for 2 years in October 2013.
Geoffrey Prime (1938–) - Former British spy, convicted of child sexual abuse, during the 1980s.
Peter Righton (1926–2007) - Founding member of the Paedophile Information Exchange. Found guilty in 1992 of possession of obscene child pornography. Mentioned in Tom Watson MP's 2012 Parliamentary Question to David Cameron.
Fred Talbot (1949–) - Former television presenter, best known for his role as a weatherman on ITV's This Morning programme. In March 2015, he was sentenced to five years in prison, having been found guilty of indecent assault against two teenaged boys at the Altrincham Grammar School for Boys, where he had taught in the 1970s. Talbot also received a further four years in June 2017 for offences carried out in Scotland in the 1970s and early 1980s. and eight months in late November 2017 for sexually assaulting a male aged over 16 on 7 June 1980.
Ray Teret (1941–2021) - Former Radio Caroline DJ and friend of Jimmy Savile, he was convicted in 2014 of seven counts of rape and 11 counts of indecent assault during the 1960s and 1970s against girls as young as 12. He was jailed for 25 years.
Tony and Julie Wadsworth - BBC radio personalities, in 2017 they were convicted of indecent assault on young boys during the 1990s.
Ian Watkins (1977–) - Founding member and lead singer of the rock band Lostprophets. In November 2013, Watkins pleaded guilty to 13 charges, including the attempted rape and sexual assault of a child under 13. He was subsequently jailed for 29 years and was ordered to serve a further six years on extended licence following completion of his sentence.
David Wilson - prolific sex offender living in King's Lynn, Norfolk preyed on his victims online. He admitted at least 96 sexual offences. He was jailed for 25 years, later 30. His offences were committed between May 2016 and December 2020.

Sexual abuse prevention

In the 11th century, surviving ordinances of Canterbury Cathedral revealed that a process was in place to minimise opportunities for clergy guilty of past abuses to engage in further illicit sexual activities with minors. Several organisations in the United Kingdom work towards the goal of preventing sexual abuse. These include the National Society for the Prevention of Cruelty to Children and the Lucy Faithful Foundation. Prevention initiatives have traditionally involved providing information to children and parents about sexual abuse and how to prevent it. Other forms of prevention involve disruption activities where the children can be removed from the family home or area in which they are living, or work can be done to make it more difficult for people to sexually abuse children.

Austerity led to cuts in policing so that the police no longer have the resources to investigate possible offences satisfactorily, or to safeguard potential victims. Nazir Afzal (formerly the Crown Prosecution Service lead on child sexual abuse and violence against women and girls) said, "Austerity has come at the wrong time.  When finally voices are being heard, finally authorities are beginning to do their job properly and finally the NGO sector are being listened to, there isn't any money to go around. They are doing this with one hand behind their back. As a consequence, clearly people will not get justice".

Nazir Afzal is also concerned that there are few prosecutions of grooming gangs in the south of England, Afzal fears people in the south are not looking hard enough. Afzal said, "The perceptions is that northern towns and the Midlands have got a better handle on it, but London, the south-east, the south-west really are not focusing on it and claiming they don't have any problems. (...) There have been hardly any cases south of Birmingham. What the hell is going on? Is it because there is no problem? I don't accept that at all. Is it because it's not a priority? I hope that's not true. I do think it's that thing about not turning over a stone."

See also
Child abuse
Northern Ireland Historical Institutional Abuse Inquiry
Scottish Child Abuse Inquiry

Further reading

 
 Adrian Bingham; Louise Settle. 'Scandals and silences: the British press and child sexual abuse', History & Policy.  http://www.historyandpolicy.org/policy-papers/papers/scandals-and-silences-the-british-press-and-child-sexual-abuse (4 August 2015)

References

External links
Sexual assault forensics centres failing some victims
Sexual Offences Act 2003

 
Violence in England
Violence in Northern Ireland
Violence in Scotland
Violence in Wales